The 2020–21 UEFA Europa League qualifying phase and play-off round began on 18 August and ended on 1 October 2020.

A total of 178 teams competed in the qualifying system of the 2020–21 UEFA Europa League, which includes the qualifying phase and the play-off round, with 35 teams in Champions Path and 143 teams in Main Path. The 21 winners in the play-off round (8 from Champions Path, 13 from Main Path) advanced to the group stage, to join the 18 teams that enter in the group stage, the 6 losers of the Champions League play-off round (4 from Champions Path, 2 from League Path), and the 3 League Path losers of the Champions League third qualifying round.

Times are CEST (UTC+2), as listed by UEFA (local times, if different, are in parentheses).

Teams

Champions Path

The Champions Path includes all league champions which are eliminated from the Champions Path qualifying phase of the Champions League, and consists of the following rounds:
Second qualifying round (20 teams): 20 teams which enter in this round (3 losers of the Champions League preliminary round and 17 losers of the Champions League first qualifying round).
Third qualifying round (18 teams): 8 teams which enter in this round (8 of the 10 losers of the Champions League second qualifying round), and 10 winners of the second qualifying round.
Play-off round (16 teams): 7 teams which enter in this round (2 of the 10 losers of the Champions League second qualifying round and 5 losers of the Champions League third qualifying round), and 9 winners of the third qualifying round.

Below are the participating teams of the Champions Path (with their 2020 UEFA club coefficients), grouped by their starting rounds.

Notes

Main Path

The Main Path includes all cup winners and league non-champions which do not qualify directly for the group stage, and consists of the following rounds:
Preliminary round (16 teams): 16 teams which enter in this round.
First qualifying round (94 teams): 86 teams which enter in this round, and 8 winners of the preliminary round.
Second qualifying round (72 teams): 25 teams which enter in this round, and 47 winners of the first qualifying round.
Third qualifying round (52 teams): 16 teams which enter in this round (including 3 League Path losers of the Champions League second qualifying round), and 36 winners of the second qualifying round.
Play-off round (26 teams): 26 winners of the third qualifying round.

Below are the participating teams of the Main Path (with their 2020 UEFA club coefficients), grouped by their starting rounds.

Notes

Format
In a change to the format as a result of the COVID-19 pandemic in Europe,  each tie is played as a single-legged match hosted by one of the teams decided by draw. If scores are level at the end of normal time, extra time is played, followed by a penalty shoot-out if the scores remain tied.

In each draw of the Champions Path, teams (whose identity may not be known at the time of the draws) are divided into seeded and unseeded pots, which may contain different numbers of teams, based on the following principles:
In the second qualifying round draw, 17 losers of the Champions League first qualifying round are seeded, and the three losers of the Champions League preliminary round are unseeded.
In the third qualifying round draw, the eight losers of the Champions League second qualifying round are seeded and the ten winners of the second qualifying round are unseeded.
In the play-off round draw, the five losers of the Champions League third qualifying round are seeded; the remaining two losers of the Champions League second qualifying round and the nine winners of the third qualifying round are unseeded.
In the beginning of the draws, a seeded team is drawn against an unseeded team until one of the pots is empty. Afterwards, the remaining teams from the non-empty pot are drawn against each other. For each tie, a draw is made between the two teams, and the first team drawn is the home team.

In each draw of the Main Path, teams are seeded based on their 2020 UEFA club coefficients. For any team whose club coefficients are not final at the time of a draw, their club coefficients at that time, taking into account of all 2019–20 UEFA Champions League and Europa League matches played up to that point, are used (Regulations Article 13.03). Teams are divided into seeded and unseeded pots containing the same number of teams, and a seeded team is drawn against an unseeded team. For each tie, a draw is made between the two teams, and the first team drawn is the home team. If the identity of the winners of the previous round is not known at the time of the draws, the seeding is carried out under the assumption that the team with the higher coefficient of an undecided tie advances to this round, which means if the team with the lower coefficient is to advance, it simply takes the seeding of its opponent. Teams from the same association or associations with political conflicts as decided by UEFA may not be drawn into the same tie. Prior to the draws, UEFA may form "groups" in accordance with the principles set by the Club Competitions Committee and based on geographical, logistical and political reasons, and they are purely for convenience of the draw and do not resemble any real groupings in the sense of the competition.

Due to the COVID-19 pandemic in Europe, all qualifying matches are played behind closed doors. The following special rules are applicable to the qualifying phase and play-offs:
Prior to each draw, UEFA publish the list of known travel restrictions related to the COVID-19 pandemic. All teams must inform UEFA if there are other existing restrictions other than those published. If a team fails to do so which as a consequence the match cannot take place, the team is considered responsible and to have forfeited the match.
If travel restrictions imposed by the home team's country prevent the away team from entering, the home team must propose an alternative venue that allows the match to take place without any restrictions. Otherwise they are considered to have forfeited the match.
If travel restrictions imposed by the away team's country prevent the away team from leaving or returning, the home team must propose an alternative venue that allows the match to take place without any restrictions. Otherwise UEFA decide on a venue.
If after the draw, new restrictions imposed by either the home team's or away team's country prevent the match from taking place, the team of that country are considered to have forfeited the match.
If either team refuses to play the match, they are considered to have forfeited the match. If both teams refuse to play or are responsible for a match not taking place, both teams are disqualified.
If a team has players and/or officials tested positive for SARS-2 coronavirus preventing them from playing the match before the deadline set by UEFA, they are considered to have forfeited the match.
In all cases, the two teams may agree to play the match at the away team's country or at a neutral country, subject to UEFA's approval. UEFA has the final authority to decide on a venue for any match, or to reschedule any match if necessary.
If, for any reason, the qualifying phase and play-offs cannot be completed before the deadline set by UEFA, UEFA decide on the principles for determining the teams qualified for the group stage.
Four countries (Poland, Hungary, Greece and Cyprus) have provided neutral venue hubs which allow matches to be played at their stadiums without restrictions.

Schedule
The schedule of the competition is as follows (all draws are held at the UEFA headquarters in Nyon, Switzerland). The tournament would originally have started in June 2020, but had been delayed to August due to the COVID-19 pandemic in Europe. The new schedule was announced by the UEFA Executive Committee on 17 June 2020.

The original schedule of the competition, as planned before the pandemic, was as follows (all draws held at the UEFA headquarters in Nyon, Switzerland, unless stated otherwise).

Preliminary round

The draw for the preliminary round was held on 9 August 2020, 13:00 CEST.

Seeding
A total of 16 teams played in the preliminary round. Seeding of teams was based on their 2020 UEFA club coefficients. The first team drawn in each tie were the home team. Teams from the same association could not be drawn against each other.

Summary

The matches were played on 18, 20 and 21 August 2020. The match between Lincoln Red Imps and Prishtina on 18 August was postponed due to the whole Prishtina team being put into quarantine after eight players had tested positive for SARS-2 coronavirus. The game was rescheduled to 22nd August, with Prishtina using UEFA regulations to sign on emergency loan players from rival Kosovar Superleague clubs Feronikel, Llapi, Trepca '89, Flamurtar, Ballkani, Drenica and Vushtrria in order to fulfil the fixture. However the rearranged fixture also had to be cancelled after 7 more players tested positive for coronavirus, and Lincoln Red Imps were awarded a technical 3–0 win by UEFA.

Matches

First qualifying round

The draw for the first qualifying round was held on 10 August 2020, 13:00 CEST.

Seeding
A total of 94 teams played in the first qualifying round: 86 teams which entered in this round, and 8 winners of the preliminary round. Seeding of teams was based on their 2020 UEFA club coefficients from matches played through 8 August 2020. For the winners of the preliminary round, whose identity was not known at the time of draw, the club coefficient of the highest-ranked remaining team in each tie was used. The first team drawn in each tie would be the home team. Teams from the same association could not be drawn against each other. Numbers were pre-assigned for each team by UEFA, with the draw held in two runs, one for Groups 1–13 with six teams and one for Groups 14–15 with eight teams.

Notes

Summary

Most matches were played on 25, 26 and 27 August 2020, however two matches were postponed to 9 and 10 September 2020.

Matches

Second qualifying round

The draw for the second qualifying round was held on 31 August 2020, 13:00 CEST.

Seeding
A total of 92 teams played in the second qualifying round. They were divided into two paths:
Champions Path (20 teams): 3 losers of the 2020–21 UEFA Champions League preliminary round, and 17 losers of the 2020–21 UEFA Champions League first qualifying round.
Main Path (72 teams): 25 teams which entered in this round, and 47 winners of the first qualifying round.
Seeding of teams in the Champions Path was based on the round they are eliminated from the Champions League. Seeding of teams in the Main Path was based on their 2020 UEFA club coefficients. For the winners of the two postponed first round matches, whose identity was not known at the time of draw, the club coefficient of the highest-ranked remaining team in each tie was used. The first team drawn in each tie would be the home team. Teams from the same association could not be drawn against each other. Numbers were pre-assigned for each team in the Main Path by UEFA, with the draw held in one run for all Groups 1–12 with six teams.

Notes

Notes

Summary

The matches were played on 16, 17 and 18 September 2020.

Champions Path

Main Path

Third qualifying round

The draw for the third qualifying round was held on 1 September 2020, 13:00 CEST.

Seeding
A total of 70 teams played in the third qualifying round. They were divided into two paths:
Champions Path (18 teams): 8 of the 10 losers of the 2020–21 UEFA Champions League second qualifying round (Champions Path), and 10 winners of the second qualifying round (Champions Path).
Main Path (52 teams): 13 teams which entered in this round, 3 losers of the 2020–21 UEFA Champions League second qualifying round (League Path), and 36 winners of the second qualifying round (Main Path).
Seeding of teams in the Champions Path was based on the round they are eliminated from the Champions League. Seeding of teams in the Main Path was based on their 2020 UEFA club coefficients. For the winners of the second qualifying round (Main Path), whose identity was not known at the time of draw, the club coefficient of the highest-ranked remaining team in each tie was used. The first team drawn in each tie would be the home team. Teams from the same association could not be drawn against each other. Numbers were pre-assigned for each team by UEFA, with the draw held in two runs, one for Groups 1–6 with six teams and one for Groups 7–8 with eight teams.

Notes

Notes

Summary

The matches were played on 23 and 24 September 2020.

Champions Path

Main Path

Play-off round

The draw for the play-off round was held on 18 September 2020, 14:00 CEST.

Seeding
A total of 42 teams played in the play-off round. They were divided into two paths:
Champions Path (16 teams): 2 of the 10 losers of the 2020–21 UEFA Champions League second qualifying round (Champions Path), 5 losers of the 2020–21 UEFA Champions League third qualifying round (Champions Path), and 9 winners of the third qualifying round (Champions Path).
Main Path (26 teams): 26 winners of the third qualifying round (Main Path).
Seeding of teams in the Champions Path was based on the round they are eliminated from the Champions League. Seeding of teams in the Main Path was based on their 2020 UEFA club coefficients. For the winners of the third qualifying round (Main Path), whose identity was not known at the time of draw, the club coefficient of the highest-ranked remaining team in each tie was used. The first team drawn in each tie would be the home team. Teams from the same association could not be drawn against each other. Numbers were pre-assigned for each team by UEFA, with the draw held in two runs, one for Groups 1–3 with six teams and one for Group 4 with eight teams.

Notes

Notes

Summary

The matches were played on 1 October 2020.

Champions Path

Main Path

Notes

References

External links

Fixtures and Results, 2020–21, UEFA.com

1
August 2020 sports events in Europe
September 2020 sports events in Europe
October 2020 sports events in Europe
UEFA Europa League qualifying rounds